Halloughton is a village in Nottinghamshire, England, 9 miles west of Newark-on-Trent. It lies in the civil parish of Southwell and the district of Newark and Sherwood. Most of the property there was owned by the Church Commissioners until 1952.

Historic buildings
The parish church of St James was rebuilt in 1879–1882. Halloughton Manor House is a 13th-century prebendal house of the college of Southwell. Its medieval tower house is now incorporated into a farmhouse built in the late 18th century.

Most of the farms and properties in the parish were owned by the Church Commissioners until 1952, when they were put for sale to their sitting tenants.

Governance
Halloughton, as a small village, holds an annual parish meeting, rather than running a parish council. It lies in the district of Newark and Sherwood and the UK parliamentary constituency of Newark.

Location and transport
The village stands at an altitude of about 65 metres (213 ft). Its population is included with Southwell's. It lies just to the north of Halloughton Dumble, a wooded valley, some 3 miles (5 km) from the River Trent at Bleasby.

Halloughton is on the main A60 road, with Nottingham (11 miles, 18 km) away and Southwell (3 miles, 5 km). It has regular daytime and evening bus services to both destinations. The nearest railway station is at Bleasby (2.5 miles, 4 km) on the Nottingham–Lincoln line.

References

External links

Villages in Nottinghamshire
Newark and Sherwood